Willits (formerly Little Lake and Willitsville) is a city in Mendocino County, California, United States. The population was 4,988 at the 2020 census. Willits is at the center of Mendocino County and at the beginning of the county's extensive redwood forests as approached by Highway 101 from the south. The Pomo tribe lived in the area before the settlers came, and the Sherwood Valley Rancheria of Pomo Indians of California is headquartered just west of Willits.

An arch stands in the center of Willits featuring the slogans "Gateway to the Redwoods" and "Heart of Mendocino County". The arch is the repurposed second version of the Reno Arch. Reno donated the arch to Willits in 1995.

History

Hiram Willits arrived from Indiana in 1857 to settle in the Little Lake Valley. Kirk Brier founded the settlement on Willits' land. Willits was originally called "Willitsville". Later, when the post office opened in 1861, it was called "Little Lake". The name changed to Willits in 1874. The community incorporated in 1888.

Little Lake was the scene of a legendary feud between the Frost and Coates families. The Frost family supported the Confederacy during the American Civil War, and the Coates family supported the Union. Both families were passionate in their beliefs. On October 16, 1867, Election Day, the long-running feud came to a head. A brawl turned into a shootout in front of Baechtel's store, leaving Abraham Coates, Henry Coates, Albert Coates, Thomas Coates and Elisha Frost dead on the street. Three others were wounded.

Willits became a boomtown due to the tanbark industry. The 1970s "back to the land" homesteading movement paved the way for Willits' reputation as the solar capital of the world in the 1980s.

The Willits area is the final home of the racehorse Seabiscuit. Ridgewood Ranch, where Seabiscuit trained, recuperated, lived out his retirement and was buried, is located a few miles south of the city.

Triple Masonic lynching of 1879

Elijah Frost, age 29, along with Abijah "Bige" Gibson and Tom McCracken, both reported to be about 19 years of age, were charged with petty larceny, having been accused of stealing a saddle and harness. The three, it was later reported, had for years been involved in stealing, robbing smokehouses, drinking, and reckless discharging of their firearms. They were arrested by a constable on August 29, 1879, shackled, and taken to Brown's Little Lake Hotel where they were to await the arrival of the circuit court judge.

A meeting was held in the Willits Masonic Temple, and during the early morning hours of September 4, 1879, a group of 30 masked "regulators", all members of the local Masonic Temple, seized the prisoners from two guards, proceeded to take the trio to a bridge north of town at the base of Sherwood Road, placed a rope around their necks and rocks in their pockets and pushed them off the side-guards of the bridge with their feet left dangling in the water, symbolic of a Masonic hanging. Their bodies were not cut down until sometime the next afternoon so as to set an example to others. The Ukiah Daily Evening Post reported, "there seems to be no proof whatever that the murdered men were guilty of the offense charged against them."

Hexavalent chromium pollution and cleanup
Beginning in 1996, the city and many residents became embroiled in lawsuits against the Whitman Corporation (later acquired by PepsiCo, Inc.), alleging that hexavalent chromium pollution left by a chrome plating plant, which operated in Willits from 1964 to 1995, was responsible for a host of local health problems. Activist Erin Brockovich, known for the eponymous movie about her work in a similar case, participated in a lawsuit on behalf of the plaintiffs. By 2003 plans were put into place to inject a solution into strategic wells at the site to neutralize the chromium and remediate the pollution on site. These plans successfully reduced the pollution, and further injections and a monitoring plan were implemented in 2005 and 2008. In 2011 various lawsuits were combined into a single suit involving paying for the site cleanup and payouts to affected individuals; most lawsuits were resolved in 2012.

Geography
It is on the west side of the Little Lake Valley, a  area surrounded by the California Coast Ranges.

Willits is located about halfway on the future Great Redwood Trail, a multi-use rail trail project.

Climate
Under the Köppen climate classification Willits has a dry-summer subtropical or mediterranean climate.

The mountains to the west along with a significant influence of mild Pacific air cause Willits to have a cool winter and hot day/cool night summer climate.

Annual precipitation averages . There are an average of 94 days with measurable precipitation.

Culture

Willits High School is located on the north end of Willits. The North County Center of Mendocino College is also in Willits.

Every July, Willits hosts the Frontier Days & Rodeo, the oldest continuous rodeo and Independence Day celebration in California. It is also home to the Roots of Motive Power Locomotive Museum, the Mendocino County Museum, and the Willits Center for the Arts.

Some notable names from Willits include Judi Bari, labor leader and environmental activist, who fought to save the redwoods. Over 1,000 people attended her Willits funeral in 1997. Tré Cool, drummer for Green Day, lived in Willits during his teen years in the 1980s. Mona Gnader, the bass player for Sammy Hagar, also resided in Willits. Stagecoach bandit Charles Bolles (a.k.a. Black Bart) stole multiple Wells Fargo boxes and mail from stagecoaches traveling through Willits.

Phil Jordon, the first National Basketball Association player ever to have played prep basketball in the Redwood Empire area (coastal Northern California & coastal Southern Oregon), did so while at Willits High School.

Demographics

2010 Census data

The 2010 United States Census reported that Willits had a population of 4,888. The racial makeup of Willits was 3,862 (79.0%) White, 34 (0.7%) African American, 216 (4.4%) Native American, 68 (1.4%) Asian, 5 (0.1%) Pacific Islander, 479 (9.8%) from other races, and 224 (4.6%) from two or more races. Hispanic or Latino of any race were 1,008 persons (20.6%).

The Census reported that 4,794 people (98.1% of the population) lived in households, 52 (1.1%) lived in non-institutionalized group quarters, and 42 (0.9%) were institutionalized.

There were 1,914 households, out of which 667 (34.8%) had children under the age of 18 living in them, 693 (36.2%) were opposite-sex married couples living together, 320 (16.7%) had a female householder with no husband present, 143 (7.5%) had a male householder with no wife present. There were 163 (8.5%) unmarried opposite-sex partnerships, and 11 (0.6%) same-sex married couples or partnerships. 609 households (31.8%) were made up of individuals, and 281 (14.7%) had someone living alone who was 65 years of age or older. The average household size was 2.50. There were 1,156 families (60.4% of all households); the average family size was 3.13.

The population dispersal was 1,270 people (26.0%) under the age of 18, 412 people (8.4%) aged 18 to 24, 1,191 people (24.4%) aged 25 to 44, 1,273 people (26.0%) aged 45 to 64, and 742 people (15.2%) who were 65 years of age or older. The median age was 37.8 years. For every 100 females, there were 90.9 males. For every 100 females age 18 and over, there were 85.1 males. The homeowner vacancy rate was 2.5%; the rental vacancy rate was 4.3%. 2,215 people (45.3% of the population) lived in owner-occupied housing units and 2,579 people (52.8%) lived in rental housing units.

2000 Census data
As of the census of 2000, there were 5,073 people, 1,935 households, and 1,230 families residing in the city. The racial makeup of the city was 4,247 (83.72%) White, 32 (0.63%) African American, 179 (3.53%) Native American, 59 (1.2%) Asian, 2 (0.04%) Pacific Islander, 359 (7.08%) from other races, and 195 (3.84%) from two or more races. Hispanic or Latino of any race numbered 745, or 14.69% of the population.

There were 1,935 households, out of which 35.6% had children under the age of 18 living with them, 40.2% were married couples living together, 17.4% had a female householder with no husband present, and 36.4% were non-families. 30.2% of all households were made up of individuals, and 14.6% had someone living alone who was 65 years of age or older. The average household size was 2.56 and the average family size was 3.15.

In the city, the population dispersal was 29.2% under the age of 18, 8.5% from 18 to 24, 25.9% from 25 to 44, 22.6% from 45 to 64, and 14.0% who were 65 years of age or older. The median age was 36 years. For every 100 females, there were 90.7 males. For every 100 females age 18 and over, there were 86.6 males. The median income for a household in the city was $26,283, and the median income for a family was $36,193. Males had a median income of $30,983 versus $22,089 for females. The per capita income for the city was $16,642. About 11.6% of families and 14.5% of the population were below the poverty line, including 18.0% of those under age 18 and 4.3% of those age 65 or over.

Economy
Major employers in Willits include the Adventist Health Howard Memorial Hospital and METALfx.

Government
Willits uses a council–manager form of government with a city council consisting of five council members. As of December 2022, the current mayor of Willits is Saprina Rodriguez.

Media

Willits is served by local and regional newspapers as well as a low-power community radio station. The community radio station is  KLLG, operated out of the Little Lake Grange. Local papers include The Mendocino Voice, Willits News, and Willits Weekly.

Transportation
Willits is the eastern terminus of the California Western Railroad (otherwise known as the "Skunk Train"), running through the Coast Redwood forests to coastal Fort Bragg. The old redwood Willits Depot was built in 1915 by the Northwestern Pacific Railroad, a subsidiary of the Southern Pacific. It is registered as a National Historic Place.

U.S. Route 101 is the major highway through the Little Lake Valley, passing just east of the Willits city limits, connecting Eureka to the north and San Francisco to the south. State Route 20 forks off of US 101 at a point just south of Willits, enters the city on South Main Street, and then heads west, running parallel to and several miles south of the Skunk Train's route, to Fort Bragg. To reduce traffic congestion in the city, especially on all of Main Street, the Willits Bypass project opened to traffic on November 3, 2016, despite the controversy related to its route through protected wetlands.

Politics

Gallery

See also

 California wine

References

External links

 
 Welcome to Willits
 Willits Chamber of Commerce

1888 establishments in California
Cities in Mendocino County, California
Incorporated cities and towns in California
Populated places established in 1888